David Rickels (born January 5, 1989) is an American professional mixed martial artist and bare-knuckle fighter who is currently competing in the Bare Knuckle Fighting Championship. A professional since 2010, he is a 23-fight veteran of the Bellator MMA, and won the Season Eight Lightweight Tournament.

Background
Rickels was born and raised in Derby, Kansas, a 2007 graduate of Derby High School where he competed in wrestling. He then went on to attend Butler Community College. Started his own promotion called Evolution Fighting Championship in late 2015.

Mixed martial arts career

Early career
Rickels compiled an amateur record of 8-1, and made his professional mixed martial arts debut in February 2010. He won via first-round TKO and went on to compile an undefeated record of 5-0 before being signed by Bellator.

Bellator MMA
Rickels made his Bellator debut on April 9, 2011, at Bellator 40 where he defeated formerly undefeated Dylan Smith by a first-round triangle choke submission.

Rickels next fought Strikeforce veteran Richard Bouphanouvong on May 7, 2011, at Bellator 43 where he won by triangle choke in round 2.

After defeating Levi Avera with a third-straight win by triangle choke in Bellator in 2011, Rickels was featured in the Bellator Season 6 Welterweight Tournament in 2012. He faced Jordan Smith in the opening round of the tournament at Bellator 63 and won via KO at just 22 seconds into the first round. In the semifinals at Bellator 69, Rickels faced Karl Amoussou. The bout was back-and-forth but in the end, Amoussou won the fight via controversial split decision, giving Rickels his first professional loss.

Rickels returned to face Jason Fischer at Bellator 82. He won via unanimous decision.

Rickels was picked to enter the Lightweight Season 8 Tournament where he defeated Lloyd Woodard in the quarterfinals at Bellator 87 via unanimous decision. Rickels was to face Russian prospect Alexander Sarnavskiy, but Sarnavskiy fractured his hand during his first fight and had to withdraw from the tournament. Rickels instead faced Jason Fischer in a rematch and won via unanimous decision. In the finals at Bellator 94, Rickels took on Saad Awad. He dropped Awad with a right hand at the very end of the second round, but Awad remained resting on his back instead of getting up to his corner, resulting in the referee declaring an end to the match, controversially making Rickels the winner by TKO.

With the tournament win, Rickels faced undefeated 11-0 Bellator Lightweight Champion Michael Chandler at Bellator 97. He lost the fight via knockout at just 44 seconds into the first round.

In March 2014, Rickels entered into the Bellator season 10 lightweight tournament, where he faced Patricky Pitbull in the opening round at Bellator 113. He lost the fight via knockout in the second round.

Rickels faced Davi Ramos on October 24, 2014, at Bellator 130. He won the fight via unanimous decision.

Rickels faced John Alessio at Bellator 139 on June 26, 2015. Rickels almost finished Alessio in the first round, but an unintentional illegal knee from Rickels landed on Alessio's head when he was down and prompted the referee to stop the fight. Alessio couldn't continue and the fight was overturned to a no contest.

Rickels had a rematch with Michael Chandler on November 6, 2015, at Bellator 145. He lost the fight via TKO in the second round.

Rickels faced Melvin Guillard on July 21, 2016, at Bellator 159. He lost the fight via knockout in the first round. However, the loss was overturned to a No-Contest after Guillard tested positive for a non-performance-enhancing banned substance.

Rickels faced Aaron Derrow at Bellator 171 on January 27, 2017. He won the fight via TKO, due to punches in the third round.

Rickels was expected to face Brennan Ward at Bellator 185 on October 20, 2017, however, an injury to Ward forced him out of the bout, and Rickels was removed from the fight card as a result.

After an injury to Derek Anderson, Rickels stepped in as a replacement to face Adam Piccolotti at Bellator 189 on December 1, 2017. He won the 160 lb catchweight fight by unanimous decision.

Rickels faced Michael Page on May 25, 2018, at Bellator 200. He lost the fight via verbal submission due to a punch in the second round.

After his 23rd fight in Bellator on August 24, 2019, Rickels became a free agent.

Bare-knuckle boxing
On January 23, 2020, news surfaced that Rickels had signed with Bare Knuckle Fighting Championship. He was expected to make his promotional debut on March 14, 2020 with opponent to be determined, but the event was cancelled. Instead, Rickels made his debut on October 10, 2020, defeating Cliff Wright by decision.

Championships and accomplishments
Bellator Fighting Championships
Bellator Season 8 Lightweight Tournament Championship
Tied (with Patrício Freire) for most fights in Bellator History (23)
Most wins of non-champ in Bellator history (14)

Mixed martial arts record

|-
|Loss
|align=center|
|Yaroslav Amosov
|Submission (D'Arce choke)
|Bellator 225
|
|align=center|2
|align=center|4:05
|Bridgeport, Connecticut, United States
|
|-
|Win
|align=center|21–5 (2)
|A.J. Matthews
|TKO (punch)
|Bellator 219
|
|align=center|2
|align=center|3:24
|Temecula, California, United States
|
|-
|Win
|align=center|20–5 (2)
|Guilherme Bomba
|Decision (unanimous)
|Bellator 210
|
|align=center|3
|align=center|5:00
|Thackerville, Oklahoma, United States
|
|-
|Loss
|align=center|19–5 (2)
|Michael Page
|TKO (retirement)
|Bellator 200
|
|align=center|2
|align=center|0:43
|London, United Kingdom
|
|-
|Win
|align=center|19–4 (2)
|Adam Piccolotti
|Decision (unanimous)
|Bellator 189
|
|align=center|3
|align=center|5:00
|Thackerville, Oklahoma, United States
|
|-
|Win
|align=center|18–4 (2)
|Aaron Derrow
|TKO (punches)
|Bellator 171
|
|align=center|3
|align=center|0:44
|Mulvane, Kansas, United States
|
|-
|NC
|align=center|17–4 (2)
|Melvin Guillard
|NC (overturned)
|Bellator 159
|
|align=center| 1
|align=center| 2:14
|Mulvane, Kansas, United States
|
|-
|Win
|align=center|17–4 (1)
|Bobby Cooper
|TKO (knee and punches)
|Bellator 150
|
|align=center|1
|align=center|3:49
|Mulvane, Kansas, United States
|
|-
|Loss
|align=center|16–4 (1)
|Michael Chandler
|TKO (punches)
|Bellator 145
|
|align=center|2
|align=center|3:05
|St. Louis, Missouri, United States
|
|-
|NC
|align=center|16–3 (1)
|John Alessio
|NC (illegal knee)
|Bellator 139
|
|align=center|1
|align=center|2:24
|Mulvane, Kansas, United States
|
|-
|Win
|align=center|16–3
|Davi Ramos
|Decision (unanimous)
|Bellator 130
|
|align=center|3
|align=center|5:00
|Mulvane, Kansas, United States
|
|-
|Loss
|align=center|15–3
|Patricky Pitbull
|KO (punches)
|Bellator 113
|
|align=center|2
|align=center|0:54
|Mulvane, Kansas, United States
|
|-
|Win
|align=center|15–2
|J.J. Ambrose
|TKO (punches)
|Bellator 103
|
|align=center|3
|align=center|2:37
|Mulvane, Kansas, United States
|
|-
|Loss
|align=center|14–2
|Michael Chandler
|KO (punches)
|Bellator 97
|
|align=center|1
|align=center|0:44
|Rio Rancho, New Mexico, United States
| 
|-
|Win
|align=center|14–1
|Saad Awad
|TKO (punches)
|Bellator 94
|
|align=center|2
|align=center|5:00
|Tampa, Florida, United States
|
|-
|Win
|align=center|13–1
|Jason Fischer
|Decision (unanimous)
|Bellator 91
|
|align=center|3
|align=center|5:00
|Rio Rancho, New Mexico, United States
|
|-
|Win
|align=center|12–1
|Lloyd Woodard
| Decision (unanimous)
|Bellator 87
|
|align=center|3
|align=center|5:00
|Mount Pleasant, Michigan, United States
|
|-
|Win
|align=center|11–1
|Jason Fischer
|Decision (unanimous)
|Bellator 82
|
|align=center| 3
|align=center| 5:00
|Mount Pleasant, Michigan, United States
|
|-
|Loss
|align=center|10–1
|Karl Amoussou
| Decision (split)
| Bellator 69
|
|align=center| 3
|align=center| 5:00
|Lake Charles, Louisiana, United States
|
|-
|Win
|align=center|10–0
|Jordan Smith
|KO (punches)
|Bellator 63
|
|align=center| 1
|align=center| 0:22
|Uncasville, Connecticut, United States
|
|-
|Win
|align=center|9–0
|Levi Avera
|Submission (triangle choke)
|Bellator 53
|
|align=center|2
|align=center|1:06
|Miami, Oklahoma, United States
|
|-
|Win
|align=center|8–0
|Kody Frank
|Decision (unanimous)
|SKC: Hotter than Hell Fight Night
|
|align=center|3
|align=center|5:00
|Wichita, Kansas, United States
|
|-
|Win
|align=center|7–0
|Richard Bouphanouvong
|Submission (triangle choke)
|Bellator 43
|
|align=center|2
|align=center|1:11
|Newkirk, Oklahoma, United States
|
|-
|Win
|align=center|6–0
|Dylan Smith
|Submission (triangle choke)
|Bellator 40
|
|align=center|1
|align=center|3:32
|Newkirk, Oklahoma, United States
|
|-
|Win
|align=center|5–0
|Aaron Fondry
|Decision (split)
|Friday Night Fights New England: Burlington
|
|align=center|3
|align=center|5:00
|Burlington, Vermont, United States
|
|-
|Win
|align=center|4–0
|Charles Jones
|Submission (triangle choke)
|C3 Fights: Slammin Jammin Weekend 6
|
|align=center|2
|align=center|2:19
|Newkirk, Oklahoma, United States
|
|-
|Win
|align=center|3–0
|Kelly Allen
|Submission (triangle choke)
|Eye Win: Showtime
|
|align=center|1
|align=center|3:31
|Wichita, Kansas, United States
|
|-
|Win
|align=center|2–0
|Michael Glenn
|Submission (armbar)
|Eye Win: Devastation
|
|align=center|1
|align=center|2:15
|Wichita, Kansas, United States
|
|-
|Win
|align=center|1–0
|Chris Evinger
|TKO (knees and punches)
|Eye Win: Valentine's Day Massacre
|
|align=center|1
|align=center|2:40
|Wichita, Kansas, United States
|

Bare knuckle record

|-
|Loss
|align=center|2–1
|Mike Richman
|KO (punch)
|BKFC 23
| 
|align=center|2
|align=center|0:32
|Wichita, Kansas, United States
|
|-
|Win
|align=center|2–0
|Julian Lane
|Decision (unanimous)
|BKFC Fight Night: Wichita
| 
|align=center|5
|align=center|2:00
|Wichita, Kansas, United States
|
|-
|Win
|align=center|1–0
|Cliff Wright
|Decision (unanimous)
|BKFC 13: Beltran vs. Stamps
| 
|align=center|5
|align=center|2:00
|Salina, Kansas, United States
|
|-

References

External links

1989 births
Living people
American male mixed martial artists
Welterweight mixed martial artists
Mixed martial artists utilizing wrestling
Bare-knuckle boxers 
People from Derby, Kansas
Mixed martial artists from Kansas